Caroline Gotzens (born August 20, 1961 in Stein near Nuremberg as Caroline Elisabeth Renate Ottilie Gräfin von Faber-Castell (Countess of Faber-Castell) is an aristocratic German-Swiss industrial heiress. She is a family member of the Cologne-based banking dynasty Oppenheim, as well as of the Frankish pencil dynasty Faber-Castell.

Family 
Gotzens is an 8th generation family member of the Cologne-based banking dynasty von Oppenheim, as well as 9th generation member of the Faber-Castell founding family. She grew up in Castle Klamm in Tyrol. The Countess never lived in the family castle. She is widely related to the princely families Castell-Castell and Castell-Rüdenhausen. Her sister Floria Princess of Hesse is married to the Head of the Hesse Foundation, Donatus Prince of Hesse. She is married to Düsseldorf-based entrepreneur Dr Michael Gotzens. The couple has three grown children.
Gotzens is the daughter of German billionaire Count Hubertus von Faber-Castell (died 2007) and Countess Liselotte Faber-Castell (née Baecker, born 1939 in Frankfurt). Her mother was married for the second time to famous Rhenish industrialist and sole owner of Hünnebeck, Hajo Hünnebeck. After his death and the resulting sale of the company, a German court ruling against the beneficiaries was named after Hünnebeck. The case filled a loophole of legal tax evasion, due to exodus. Hünnebeck is now part of the Harsco Corporation and generated 40% of its revenue in 2018. Her father, Count Hubertus, brought commercial television to China and is the only European honorary citizen of Beijing. Gotzens was with her grandparents, Roland Count of Faber-Castell and Countess Alix-May, a victim of constant anti-Semitic attacks because her grandmother was born into the German banking dynasty Oppenheim, which had Jewish roots. The magazine Der Stürmer criticized her luxurious lifestyle and the words 'Die Oppenheim, das Judenschwein, muss raus aus Stein' (Oppenheim, the Jew-pig, has to leave Stone) were written on the family's castle. In order to remain in control of the family’s bank, she and her cousins stayed in Germany. Later, the Oppenheim family had to hide. Gotzens left with her grandmother to Switzerland.

Collection 
Her ancestors were famous for collecting art. After the division of the estate, Gotzens obtained ownership of many important pieces. As heir to her grandmother Alix-May, Gotzens litigates in court to receive back the painting 'Die Malkunst' of Jan Vermeer. The painting was allegedly sold under duress by her step-grandfather to Adolf Hitler. The painting is estimated to be worth around 150 to 400 Million Euros and is regarded as the most expensive art piece in Austria. Gotzens is the owner of one of the most important silver and jewellery collections in Germany. Most of the pieces are available to the public in various German museums. The entire private collection has been recorded by the Kunstmuseum Köln under the name "Ein rheinischer Silberschatz-Schmuck und Gerät aus Privatbesitz" (A Rhenish Silver Treasure - Jewellery and Appliances from Private Ownership).

Scandal 
The Countess is one of the wealthiest women in Germany. Her assets are managed by a family office based in Switzerland. Among others, the Family Office was a silent partner in Infront Sports Media. She was mentioned in connection with her brother Patrick Alexander Count of Faber-Castell and Nicole, Countess Brachetti-Peretti, who had shared interest through the Junkermann Group, in Infront Sports Media. This involvement earned much negative media attention, as their co-owner Robert Louis-Dreyfus allegedly abused the company for bribes to FIFA officials. In 2011, Infront was sold to private equity firm Bridgepoint by the consortium of shareholders for approximately 550 million euros. Further attention caught the media-shy woman by the revelation of the Panama Papers. She was accused of having facilitated tax burdens in the double-digit million range by Caribbean letterbox companies. The Countess did not comment on the allegations.

References

See also 
Oppenheim Family
Faber-Castell Family

1961 births
Living people
German countesses
German people of Jewish descent